The 1913 Giro di Lombardia was the ninth edition of the Giro di Lombardia cycle race and was held on 2 November 1913. The race started and finished in Milan. The race was won by Henri Pélissier.

General classification

References

1913
Giro di Lombardia
Giro di Lombardia